Andriyevo-Ivanove is a village in Rozdilna Raion of Odesa Oblast (province) of southern Ukraine. It is part of Rozdilna urban hromada, one of the hromadas of Ukraine.

History
Andriyevo-Ivanove was founded in 1944 by uniting several farms and inclusion in it by the former Jewish and German agricultural settlements of Shtern (Zorya, Miller, Lambert). In 1924, 67 people lived in Shtern and 202 lived there in 1943. On 1 February 1945, the village took its current name. On 1 September 1946, the village of Andriyevo-Ivanove was part of the Bryniv Village Council. On 1 May 1967, the Kirov collective farm was located in Andriyevo-Ivanove.

Demographics 
According to the 1989 Soviet census, the population of the village was 217 people, of whom 99 were men and 118 women.

According to the 2001 Ukrainian census, 192 people lived in the village.

Languages 
According to the 2001 census, the primary languages of the inhabitants of the village were:

References

Populated places established in 1944
Kherson Governorate
Villages in Rozdilna Raion